A search fund is an investment vehicle through which an entrepreneur raises funds from investors in order to acquire a company in which they wish to take an active, day-to-day leadership role. There are currently three primary vehicle types a search fund might take: self-funded, traditional, and solo-sponsor. Most academic material and data are related to the traditional model.

The self-funded Searcher follows a similar process to the traditional and solo-sponsor searchers aside from self-financing their search process and sometimes their own acquisition. They do not seek out investors but live off of savings until they acquire a company. At that point they request funding for equity in the company they want to acquire. The self-funded searcher maintains 50% or more of the company after the acquisition. Often, more than 70%. 

Traditional and solo-sponsor backed searchers receive funding at two points. First, to finance their sourcing period: this includes their salary, due diligence costs, and other expenses that may arise. Second, to finance the equity portion of the company they want to acquire. They often keep anywhere from 8% to 25% of the company and their investors keep 75% or more. The distinction between the traditional and solo-sponsor search fund is the number of investors supporting them.

The search fund process occurs across multiple stages. In the first stage, a small group of investors back a potential operating manager or 'searcher' to find and acquire a company. This is the fundraising stage. After receiving funds, the search fund will enter the second stage: deal sourcing. A fund may or may not find a target acquisition company. If they find a company and convince their original investors to provide equity to acquire their business they enter into a third stage: operating the business. For an average of five years the searcher will try to grow the business they acquired as the new CEO, pay down debt from the acquisition process, and pay back their investors. The fourth and final stage occurs roughly seven years after fundraising: exiting. The search fund will seek new buyers to acquire the company from them and split the proceeds with their investors.

The most popular academic resource describing the process, brief history, and results is the Stanford Search Fund Primer. While the industry was born out of the partnership of a Harvard Business School lecturer and recent alumnus, much of the continued research and investment in the traditional model has been done at the Graduate School of Business at Stanford.

Investors are able to invest a pro-rata share in the target company, subject to their individual liking. 

Traditional search funds typically target companies in the $5 million to $50 million price range, requiring millions of dollars of equity capital from their investors and millions more in debt, in fragmented industries, with sustainable market positions, histories of stable cash flows, and long term opportunities for improvement and growth. Service and light manufacturing companies outside high tech industries have historically been popular targets. Recently, SAAS and other tech related businesses have gained in popularity. Often these companies are under-managed prior to the acquisition.

Most search funds are started by individuals or partners with limited operational experience and possibly no direct experience in the target industry. The goal of the investor is to back promising, motivated managers in an environment with a high probability for success given the match between the manager and the business they want to acquire.

The origins of the search fund are often traced back to H. Irving Grousbeck, a professor at Stanford University's Graduate School of Business, who originated the concept in 1984 while lecturing at Harvard Business School. Since then, it is estimated that 627 traditional funds have been or are currently being formed, with 198 operating currently. The bulk of successful search funds have been raised by alumni of elite MBA programs with access to strong private equity networks. Stanford University has documented more than 177 search funds.

Professional communities such as searchfunder have become popular in recent years. This exists as a resource to find a variety of members in the search fund world and communicate with them privately or in forums. 

Material about search funds is becoming rampant as books, blogs, podcasts, and free guides like The Search Guide are being created by industry veterans to share their experiences and resources they recommend. That includes instructions for how to set up and operate a search fund with appropriate tools as well as lists of investors to help fund the acquisition. 
In addition to some of these communities and free resources, many groups are being formed which charge money to teach classes about searching. Some of these are led by industry veterans while others are not, despite charging thousands of dollars. searchfund.org is one example which does both - offering some upfront resources that are free or with affiliate links to purchase books, but also offering to teach them about the experience of a longtime financier and investor in the industry, connecting them with processes they liked in their portfolio as well as appropriate 3rd parties to help buy a business, while hundreds or thousands of dollars in fees depending on the course.

References

External links 
 Search Fund Resource for Relevant Information
 Search fund resources at the Stanford Center for Entrepreneurial Studies
 HBR Guide to Buying a Small Business
 Searchfunder
 The Search Guide
 Understanding the Search Fund Model

Private equity
Investment